The Western Front was a front of the Red Army during the Russian Civil War and Polish-Soviet War, which existed between February 12, 1919 and April 8, 1924. The Western Front was first established on the basis of the administration of the disbanded Northern Front. The Front headquarters were located consequently in  Staraya Russa, Molodechno, Dvinsk, Smolensk and Minsk .

Operations 

At the time of the formation of the Western Front, Soviet troops were fighting on a front some 2,000 km long, stretching from Murmansk (against the White Northern Army and the Entente interventionists), over the Karelian Isthmus (against Finland), and the Baltics to the Belorussian Front (against Estonian, Latvian, Lithuanian formations and Russian White Guards, supported by German and Polish troops).  

By July 1919, the Soviet Armies of the Western Front had retreated from the Baltic area under the onslaught of the enemy. In Belarus, the Polish offensive was stopped in August on the Berezina River. In August 1919 the Front forces were on the line of the Gulf of Finland-Pskov-Polotsk-Berezina river.

In June-August and October-November 1919, the 7th and 15th Armies, supported by the ships of the Baltic Fleet, repelled two offensives of the White Northwestern Army under Yudenich against Petrograd and defeated it, which allowed the concentration of the main efforts of the Red Army in the fight against the armies of Denikin and Kolchak.

In 1920, the Western Front became the main front of the Soviet Republic and it participated in repelling the offensive of the Polish Army during the Soviet-Polish War. The May operation (1920) of the Western Front, although it did not achieve its goals, created favorable conditions for a successful counteroffensive of the troops of the South-Western Front in Ukraine.

As a result of the July operation (1920) of the Western Front, Belarus and parts of Lithuania were occupied, and in August 1920 the troops of the Western Front approached Warsaw. However, the reassessment by the Soviet command of its forces and the underestimation of the enemy's forces, as well as bad coordination between the Western and South-Western Fronts, led to the defeat of the Soviet troops of the Western Front in the Battle of Warsaw (1920) and their withdrawal.

Despite the defeat of the Red Army, Poland didn't continue the War and a truce was signed on 12 October, which enabled the Red Army to concentrate its main forces against Wrangel's troops around the Crimean Peninsula.

The Western Front and its administration continued to exist after the end of hostilities, until it was transformed into the Western Military District on April 8, 1924.

Composition 

 7th Army (19.02.1919 - 10.05.1921),
 16th Army (a.k.a. Western Army and Belarusian-Lithuanian Army) (19.02.1919 - 07.05.1921),
 15th Army (a;k.a. Soviet Latvian Army) (19.02.1919 - 04.10.1920),
 Estonian Army (19.02.1919 - 30.05.1919),
 12th Army (16.06.1919 - 27.07.1919, 07.09.1919 - 17.10.1919, 14.08.1920 - 27.09.1920),
 3rd Army (11.06.1920 - 31.12.1920),
 4th Army (11.06.1920 - 18.10.1920),
 1st Cavalry Army (14.08.1920 - 27.09.1920),
 Reserve Army (04.1920 - 11.1920)
 Mozyr group (18.05.1920 - 09.1920)
 Dnieper Flotilla (1919)

Commanders 

Commander : 
 Dmitry Nikolayevich Nadyozhny  (19.02.1919 - 22.07.1919)
 Vladimir Gittis (22.07.1919 - 29.04.1920)
 Mikhail Tukhachevsky (29.04.1920 - 04.03.1921)
 Ivan Zakharov (04.03.1921 - 20.09.1921)
 Alexander Yegorov (20.09.1921 - 24.01.1922)
 Mikhail Tukhachevsky (24.01.1922 - 26.03.1924)
 August Kork (26.03.1924 - 05.04.1924)
 Alexander Kuk (05.04.1924 - 08.04.1924)

Chief of Staff :
 
 Nokolai Domogyrov (19.02.1919 — 26.05.1919),
 Nikolai Petin (26.05.1919 — 17.10.1919),
 Alaksei Peremytov (17.10.1919 — 13.11.1919),
 Vladimir Lazarevich (13.11.1919 — 09.02.1920),
 Nikolai Schwartz (25.02.1920 - 30.09.1920)
 Nikolai Sollogub (01.10.1920 - 06.12.1920)
 Pavel Ermolin (06.12.1920 - 07.06.1921)
 Mikhail Batorsky (07.06.1921 - 23.11.1921)
 Sergei Mezheninov (23.11.1921 - 06.07.1923)
 Ivan Gludin (06.07.1923 - 30.09.1923)
 Alexander Kuk  (30.09.1923 - 08.04.1924)

Members of the Revolutionary Military Council include :
 Boris Pozern
 Reingold Berzin
 Joseph Stalin
 Konstantin Yurenev
 Józef Unszlicht
 Arkady Rosengolts
 Ivar Smilga
 Felix Dzerzhinsky
 Romuald Muklevich

Source 
 

Soviet units and formations of the Russian Civil War
Military units and formations established in 1919
Military units and formations disestablished in 1924
Soviet fronts